Renáta Tyršová (née Renata Maria Adelina Fügner; 31 July 1854, Prague – 22 February 1937, Prague) was a Czech ethnographer and art historian. She is best remembered for writing about embroidery, folk costume, and home decor in Bohemia, Moravia, and Silesia in her works Rukopis Královodvorský (1896), Slovácké vyšívání (1897), Lidový kroj v Čechách, na Moravě a ve Slezsku (1918), and Nauka o kroji (1923).

References

1854 births
1937 deaths
Czech art historians
Czech ethnographers
People from Prague